Byron Otto Thomas (born March 20, 1969), better known by his stage name Mannie Fresh, is an American record producer and rapper. He's best known for his productions on Cash Money Records releases, as well being half of the hip hop duo (alongside label co-founder Birdman) the Big Tymers. He produced all or most of the songs on 17 multi-platinum, platinum or gold albums for Cash Money from 1998 to 2004 before leaving the label.  He also was their only in-house producer when the company started in 1991.

Life and career 
Thomas was born and raised in the 7th Ward of New Orleans. Influenced by his father DJ Sabu, Thomas became a DJ for New Orleans hip hop crew New York Incorporated in 1984 at age 15. In the late 1980s, he began a partnership with New Orleans rapper MC Gregory D. They released their first album together Throwdown in 1987, with Mannie Fresh producing and MC Gregory D rapping. They would release two more records together in the late 1980s and early 1990s. After their last album together, in 1993, Thomas met Bryan "Baby" Williams, who gave him an opportunity to become the in-house producer of his record label Cash Money Records. With Williams' help, Thomas made chart-topping albums for the Hot Boys, which was composed of Lil Wayne, B.G., Juvenile, and Turk, producing all of the group's albums. He also produced all tracks on the members' solo works as well.

Later, Thomas formed the Big Tymers along with Williams, as Mannie Fresh and Birdman respectively, bringing him fame, and released five albums. In 2004, he released his own debut solo album The Mind of Mannie Fresh, which consisted of 30 tracks and featured the single "Real Big," which peaked at #72 on the Billboard Hot 100. In 2005, he split from Cash Money for financial reasons, and later joined Def Jam South, to which he is currently signed. On October 27, 2009, Mannie Fresh released his second solo album, Return of the Ballin'. The album was entirely produced by Fresh himself and featured prominent guests Rick Ross and Lil Jon.

Discography

Studio albums 
 The Mind of Mannie Fresh (2004)
 Return of the Ballin' (2009)

References 

1969 births
Living people
Cash Money Records artists
African-American male rappers
African-American record producers
People from Destrehan, Louisiana
Rappers from New Orleans
Def Jam Recordings artists
American hip hop record producers
Southern hip hop musicians
Trap musicians
Musicians from New Orleans
African-American songwriters
Songwriters from Louisiana
21st-century American rappers
21st-century American male musicians
21st-century African-American musicians
20th-century African-American people
American male songwriters
Cash Money Millionaires members